Swanlake is an unincorporated community in Bannock County, Idaho, United States. Swanlake has a post office with ZIP code 83281.

Demographics

2010 census

As of the census of 2010, there were 93 people, 36 households, and 29 families residing in the city. The racial makeup of the city was 100% White. Hispanic or Latino of any race were 2.2% of the population.

The median age in the city was 44.3 years. 31.2% of residents were under the age of 19; 0.0% were between the ages of 20 and 24; 20.5% were from 25 to 44; 28% were from 45 to 64; and 20.4% were 65 years of age or older. The gender makeup of the city was 51.6% male and 48.4% female.

References

External links

 Swan Lake Idaho Centennial Celebration Page

Unincorporated communities in Bannock County, Idaho
Unincorporated communities in Idaho